Ingemar Lundström, born 9 May 1941 in Skellefteå, Sweden, is a Swedish professor of applied physics at Linköping University.

Professor Lundström received his B.S. in electrical engineering in 1967 at Chalmers University of Technology and his Ph.D. in solid state physics in 1970 from the same university. He worked at Chalmers until 1978, when he was appointed a professor in the chair of applied physics at Linköping University, a position he still holds.

His primary research areas are in biosensors and chemical sensors.

Lundström is a member of the Royal Swedish Academy of Engineering Sciences since 1982 and a member of the Swedish Royal Academy of Science since 1987.

He was elected to the Nobel Committee for Physics in 2006, and is its chairman from 2010.

Awards
 Björkénska Prize, Uppsala University, 1986
 Outstanding Contribution to the International Chemical Sensor Community, 4th International Meeting of Chemical Sensors, 1992
 Erna Ebelings Prize, Swedish Medical Association, 1994
 Chester Carlson Award, 1997
 Outstanding Achievement Award, Sensor Division of the Electrochemical Society, 1998
 Gold Medal, Royal Swedish Academy of Engineering Sciences, 1999
 Akzo Nobel Science Award, 2001
 Honorary Doctorate, Royal Institute of Technology, 2001

Sources

External links

Ingemar Lundström's web page at Linköping University with CV and publication list

1941 births
Living people
Swedish physicists
Chalmers University of Technology alumni
Academic staff of Linköping University
Members of the Royal Swedish Academy of Engineering Sciences
Members of the Royal Swedish Academy of Sciences
People from Skellefteå Municipality